Strumpet City was a 1980 television miniseries produced by Irish broadcaster RTÉ, based on James Plunkett's 1969 novel Strumpet City.

It was RTÉ's most ambitious and expensive production to date. The script was written by Hugh Leonard, and Peter O'Toole played James Larkin, the union leader. The cast also included Cyril Cusack as the alcoholic priest, Father Giffley, Donal McCann as the Larkin supporter, Mulhall, David Kelly as the destitute "Rashers" Tierney and Bryan Murray as Fitz, the young unemployed worker who ends up in the trenches. Frank Grimes won a Jacob's Award for his portrayal of the young Catholic curate, Father O'Connor. Peter Ustinov made a cameo appearance in the first episode as Edward VII.

First shown in Ireland in 1980, the series was exported to the United Kingdom, where it was shown on all regions of ITV bar Southern in late 1981, and on Southern's successor company TVS in 1982. It was then repeated by Scottish Television in 1983 and on Channel 4 and S4C in 1984.

In 2004, a digitised and remastered version was released on DVD by Acorn Media UK.

On RTE Player to celebrate 60 Years Of Television Christmas 2021.

External links

References

1980 Irish television series debuts
1980 Irish television series endings
RTÉ original programming
Irish television miniseries
Television shows set in Ireland
Television series set in the 1900s
Television series set in the 1910s
Television shows set in Dublin (city)